The Packer Collegiate Institute is an independent college preparatory school for students from pre-kindergarten through grade 12. Formerly the Brooklyn Female Academy, Packer has been located at 170 Joralemon Street in the historic district of Brooklyn Heights neighborhood of Brooklyn, New York City since its founding in 1845.

History 

In Brooklyn Heights in 1845, a committee of landowners and merchants interested in improving the education of girls raised funds for a new school, which they called the Brooklyn Female Academy, and which they located on Joralemon Street. Although the school was successful, both financially and educationally, with steadily increasing enrollment, on January 1, 1853, the building caught fire and burned to the ground.

The Academy received an offer from Harriet L. Packer, the widow of William S. Packer, to give $65,000 towards rebuilding the school if it were named after her late husband; this would be the largest gift ever made for the education of girls. The new building was designed by the Minard Lafever, a noted designer of Brooklyn churches, and opened in November 1854. The chapel is notable for having stained-glass Tiffany windows.

After the Episcopal parish of St. Ann's, whose James Renwick-designed church at Livingston and Clinton street was around the corner from the school, moved into the abandoned Holy Trinity Church on Montague Street – also designed by Minard Lafever – in 1969, the church was sold to the school.  A modernist connecting building, including a glass atrium which can be seen from Livingston Street, was added in 2003, designed by Hugh Hardy of H3 Collaborative Architecture.

Until 1972 Packer was primarily a girls school, with boys attending only kindergarten through fourth grade while girls and young women were enrolled through high school as well as a two-year junior college.  The junior college program is no longer operational.

A 5-year-plan completed in 2017 changed many facets of student life at Packer. A traditional 5-weekday schedule was replaced with a 7-day rotating schedule, the maximum number of classes a day changed from 6 to 5, the last class of every day was extended from 50 minutes to 90 minutes (with each of a students' maximum 7 total classes – down from 8 – having a 90-minute period once during each cycle), the addition of a time of day called "community" dedicated to clubs and other activities so that each student had a lunchtime, and the revamping of the advising program, among others. This scheduling system was altered due to COVID-19, but has since returned.

Early in 2018, Headmaster Bruce Dennis (1949-2022) announced that he would retire at the end of the 2018–2019 school year. On October 3, 2018, Packer announced that Dr. Jennifer Weyburn had been selected to become headmaster after Dr. Dennis's retirement.

Technology 
Many technological resources found at Packer aim to facilitate collaboration, innovation, expression, understanding and exploration. The school believes that in the hands of the faculty and students, technology could strengthen the school's learning community. Packer has a laptop program and the institution describes itself as a "laptop school where technology is woven into the curriculum at all levels." The guidelines of the program state that every student must have a laptop from fifth grade through graduation in twelfth grade. Met with much skepticism at first, Time reports the thinking behind the laptop program in detail below:

The wireless Packer would be very different from the old Packer. All assignments, handouts, work sheets, what-have-you would be distributed electronically. (Thus rendering the copy machine, possibly the only device on earth less reliable than the computer, obsolete.) Students would take notes on their laptops in class, then take their laptops home and do their homework on them. To turn in an assignment, they would simply drag and drop it into the appropriate folder, where the teacher could wirelessly retrieve it. Voila: the paperless classroom.

Arts 
Packer has visual arts, photography, media arts, dance, drama, orchestra, brass choir, chamber music, wind ensemble, chorus and a Middle and Upper School jazz band. Among Packer's facilities lies the Janet Clinton Performing Arts Center, which features instrumental and choral music classrooms, a dance studio and the Pratt Theater. This performance space supports theatrical productions throughout the year.

Notable alumni and faculty 

 Frances Julia Barnes (1846–1920) – temperance reformer
 Judi Barrett, 1958 – author (Cloudy with a Chance of Meatballs)
 Mary C.C. Bradford – educator and suffragist
 Cornelia Chase Brant – Dean of New York Medical College and Hospital for Women
 Mary Bunting, 1929 – president of Radcliffe College and first woman appointed to the Atomic Energy Commission
 Lucy Burns – suffragist
 Caroline Chesebro' (1825–1873) – writer
 Elizabeth Gaffney – editor and author (Metropolis: A Novel)
 Virginia Granbery – painter
 Ethan Hawke – attended the 7th grade – actor (Reality Bites, Dead Poets Society), writer and producer
 Virginia Heinlein, 1935 – wife of and co-author with Robert A. Heinlein
 Tadzio Koelb, novelist and critic
 Malcolm D. Lee, 1988 – film and television director (Roll Bounce, Everybody Hates Chris, Undercover Brother)
 Minnie Dessau Louis (1841–1922), educator
 Lois Lowry (born 1937), 1956 – author (Number the Stars, The Giver)
 Dorothy Marckwald (1898–1986), interior designer 
 Pauline Van de Graaf Orr (1861-1955), educator and suffragist
 Mary Orwen (1913–2005), abstract artist, art instructor
 Mary White Ovington (1865–1951), 1890 – author, civil rights leader, co-founder and Executive Secretary of the NAACP
 Fanny Purdy Palmer (1839–1923) – author, lecturer, activist
 Dora Knowlton Ranous (1859–1916) – author, editor, translator, book reviewer
 Lincoln Restler, 2002 – politician
 Darrian Robinson, 2012 – chess player 
 Rosanna Scotto, 1976 – television news anchor, FOX 5 News (New York City)
 Emily Elizabeth Veeder – novelist, poet
 Deborah Ann Woll, 2003 – actress (True Blood and Daredevil)
 Mary Woronov, 1962 – member of Andy Warhol's Factory.
 Lois Wilson, 1912 – founder of Al-Anon, and wife of Bill Wilson, the founder of Alcoholics Anonymous.
 Elisabeth Irwin, 1897 — founder of Little Red Schoolhouse
 Marie Zimmermann — designer and maker of jewelry and metalwork

In popular culture

Packer can be seen as a set for the CW television series Gossip Girl in multiple episodes throughout the first three seasons, as both interior and exterior locations.

References
Notes

External links

Private high schools in Brooklyn
Private middle schools in Brooklyn
Private elementary schools in Brooklyn
Private K-12 schools in New York City
Preparatory schools in New York City
Educational institutions established in 1845
1845 establishments in New York (state)